Abhisek Lahiri (born 24 September 1983) is an Indian classical sarod player with training in the three major gharanas of sarod which are Shahjahanpur, Maihar gharana, and Senia Bangash (Gwalior) from his father and guru Pt. Alok Lahiri. Primarily he belongs to the Maihar gharana

Early life

Abhisek started performing in public at an early age of 11 years though he got his first break in national level in 1997 when he was invited by Pandit Hariprasad Chaurasia to play at "Saath Saath Festival". That year he gave his debut performance abroad in Holland at the "World Kinder Festival" where he was named as a 'Wonder Kid', leading to concerts through Europe, U.K., U.S.A., Canada, Sri Lanka, Japan, Bangladesh, and Singapore. He performed with his father, Pandit Alok Lahiri, as the first Indians at the European Parliament in France, Cannes World Music Festival and also in Canada Culture Days in Toronto. 

Abhisek formed a world music trio named IONAH with Japanese guitarist Hideaki Tsuji and Indian tabla player Pandit Parimal Chakrabarty. He is also part of the EMME collective (East Meets Middle East) of Chicago, USA.

In 2017, Abhisek was sent to Morocco and Cyprus as a Cultural Delegate of India by the ICCR, Ministry of Culture, Govt. Of India. Abhisek's music albums "Sparkling Sarod" received a nomination at GiMA (Global Indian Music Academy Awards) in 2010 and in 2014, again his album "Mood Of Puriya Kalyan" got nominated along with the legends of our country such as Pt Hariprasad Chaurasia, Pt Shivkumar Sharma, Ustad Zakir Hussain, Ustad Rashid Khan and many more.

Awards and recognition
Nominated twice for Global Indian Music Awards (GiMA) as best Hindustani Classical Album- Instrumental, alongside legends of music world: 
Anun Lund Rej Memorial Award from the Norwegian Consulate
Certificate of Appreciation from Rotary International Club & Lions Club- Toronto
The Telegraph School Award as an outstanding talent in Eastern Classical Music, presented by Chief Minister of West Bengal
President Award in Sarod through All India Radio (AIR) Music Competition
Rashtriya Gaurav Award from New Delhi
Ustad Afzallur Rahman Memorial Award from Brahmanberia, Bangladesh
Empaneled member Artist of Indian Council for Cultural Relations (ICCR), New Delhi
Sangeet Ratnakar & Sangeet Visharad from Sabrbharatiya Sangeet o Sanskriti Parishad
Jadubhatta Purashkar from Salt Lake Cultural Association
National Scholarship for outstanding performance in Sarod, from the Ministry of Human Resources & Development and Tourism & Culture, Govt of India- New Delhi

Major Performances (International)
Darbar Festival, London
Sacred Music Festival, Strasbourg - France
Europe Parliament - France European Parliament
Canada Culture Days, Hamilton - Canada
World Music Day Festival - Cannes
Theatre de la Ville- Paris Théâtre de la Ville
Tropen Theatre – Amsterdam
RASA Theatre- Utrecht
Musée Guimet- Paris
India Night Festival, Stuttgart - Germany
FIMU Festival- Belfort, France
Raag-Mala Music Society- Edmonton and Calgary
Virasat Foundation, Surrey - Canada 
TSS Multicultural Festival, Toronto
The Malhar Group Spring Fest - Hamilton Canada
Shilpakala Academy & Alliance Francaise de Dhaka - Bangladesh
India Culture Centre, Tokyo - Japan
International Classical Guiter Festival
Hamamatsu Museum of Musical Instruments, Japan
University of Victoria, Vancouver
Eye on India Festival, Chicago
Indian Music Society of Minnesota, Minneapolis
Basant Bahar, San Francisco Bay area
Sangitabhimana Festival – Colombo, Sri Lanka
Rialto Festival, Cyprus
 Vollubillis International Festival, Morocco
Sifas Festival, Singapore

Major Performances in India

• Saath-Saath Festival in Mumbai, organized by legendary Pt. Hari Prasad Chaurasia
• RIMPA Festival (Ravi Shankar Institute) in New Delhi
• All India Radio Music Festival in Shimla
• Dover Lane Music Conference in Kolkata
• Harivallabh Sangeet Sammelan in Jalandhar
• Ramakrishna Mission Institute of Culture in Golpark (Kolkata)
• Sangeet Natak Academy Sangeet Pratibha Festival in Gwalior
• National Center for Performing Arts (NCPA) - Mumbai
• Biswa Banga Sammelan on behalf of Govt. of West Bengal
• Basanta Utsav in Jorasanko Thakurbari - Kolkata
• Saptak Music Festival - Nasik
• West Bengal State Music Academy Annual Concert - Kolkata
• India Habitat Centre in New Delhi 
• Jnana Pravaha Music Festival, presented by Sangeet Ashram, Kolkata 
• Arohi Music Festival- Mumbai	
• Isha Yaksha Festival in Coimbatore
• Anirban Sangeet Sammelan - Kolkata
• Saltlake City Music Festival - Kolkata
• Ballygunj Maitreyi Music Circle - Kolkata
• Paramparik Music Festival - Kolkata
• Sangeet Piyasi - Kolkata
• Swaramayee Gurukul - Pune
• Bhairav Kalyan Utsav’05 & Smriti Utsav’ 09 in Mumbai 
• Kalibari Music Festival - Lucknow
• Music Festival in Assam & Tripura 
• Culturall Music Conference in Allahabad 
• Sangit Parishad Kashi in Varanashi
• Ustad Rahimat Khan Sangeet Samaroh in Dharwad
• Ustad Rajjab Ali Khan Sangeet in Dewas
• Dr Arun Kumar Sen Smriti Samaroh in Raipur

Album

 Sparkling Sarod
 Mood of Puriya Kalyan
 Genius of Sarod
 Rhythm Redefined
 Musical Sojourn
 Parampara
 Ionah Trio

References

External links
 Official website 
 Chhandayan USA
 MITHAS
 itunes
 amsterdam concert
 Press Releases
 Performances

Sarod players
1983 births
Living people